The Alavi Bohras are a Tayyibi Musta'lavi Isma'ili Shi'i Muslim community from Gujarat, India. In India, during the time of the 18th Fatimid Imam Al-Mustansir Billah around 1093 AD in Egypt, the designated learned people (wulaat) who were sent from Yemen by missionaries (du'aat) under the guidance of the imam established a da'wah in Khambhat (Gujarat, India).

After the division of the Musta'lid community, the Yemenite Da'wah followed their 21st imam, the son of 20th Imam Al-Amir bi-Ahkam Allah in the succession of Fatimid Imams of Egypt, At-Tayyib Abu'l-Qasim as their Imam of seclusion, and the Bohras are the modern descendants of Tayyibi Da'wah established from Khambhat, Patan and Sidhpur in the 5th century Hijri and also the immigrants from Yemeni Tayyibi Da'wah.

Subsequently, splits occurred at various instances in the mainstream Bohra community regarding the spiritual appointment in the succession of the representative of the Imam us Satr or Da’i in Ahmedabad between 1422 and 1640 AD. Two major splits during this period resulted in the formation of three major groups of Bohras: Alavis, Dawoodis and Sulaymanis.

History
After the death of the legatee of the Islamic prophet Muhammad, Ali in 40 AH, his son Hasan became the first Imam and this institution of Imamat i.e. succession of al-A'immat al-Faatemiyeen-الائمۃ الفاطمیین continued from father to son till the 21st Imam. This 21st Fatimid Imam At-Tayyib Abu'l-Qasim went into seclusion from Egypt in 528 AH, in Yemen under the guidance of Al-Hurrah Al-Malikah Arwa bint Ahmad from 532 AH, one da'i succeeded another through the tradition of nass: the exclusive spiritual appointment, until the 23rd Da'i i.e. from 1st Da'i Zoeb bin Saiyedi Moosa till 23rd Da'i Mohammad Izzuddin. In Sindh and India too Wali-ul-Hind ولي الھند were appointed by these Du'aat دعاۃ one after another until Wali-ul-Hind Ja'far, Abd ul Wahab and Qasim Khan bin Hasan (11th and last Wali-ul-Hind, d.950AH, Ahmedabad). The last three wali were of great help in the era of the 21st to 24th Da'i i.e. Husamuddin (921–932 AH), Shamsuddin (933 AH), Izzuddin (933–946 AH) and Najmuddin (946–974 AH). It was during this time when the seat of Da'wat e Haadiyah was transferred to India from Yemen, that the 23rd Da'i ul-Mutlaq   الداعي المطلق Muhammad Izz al-Din I performed Nass (transfer of authority) on Yusuf Najmuddin I in Sidhpur, Gujarat, India.

Due to constant harassment and persecution by the local Zaydi Shi'a ruler in Yemen, the 24th Da'i, Yusuf Najmuddin I (d.1567 AD), shifted the whole administration of the Da'wat Haadiyah (rightly guided mission) to India but continued to live in Yemen in the last years of his tenure and died there in Taibah. See Al-Mutahhar for further information. The 25th Da'i Jalal Shamshuddin bin Hasan (d.1567 AD) was first Da'i to die in India and he was torch-bearer in establishing the representation (نیابۃ) of the Imam of the Time (امام الزمان) from the progeny of Muhammad though he stayed for only 4 months on the Seat of Da'wat (عرش الدعوۃ); his mausoleum is in Ahmedabad, India. As mentioned his tenure as a Da'i al-Mutlaq was very short but he played a pivotal role as one of the most trusted person from Hudood and as a Mazoon during the period of 23rd and 24th Da'i.

Following the death of the 26th Da'i Dawoodji Burhanuddin bin Saiyedi Ajabshah in 997 AH/1591 AD in Ahmedabad, there was a dispute as to who was to succeed him. Sulayman bin Hassan, the grandson of 24th Da'i Yusuf Najmuddin I, was wali in Yemen and claimed the succession, supported by the other Yemeni Bohra. However, the Indian Bohra denied his claim of nass, declaring supporting documentation to be forged. The two factions separated, with the followers of Sulayman becoming the Sulaymanis, and the followers of 27th Da'i Dawoodji Burhanuddin bin Qutubshah becoming the Dawoodi Bohra.

After the death of the 28th Da'i, Sheikh Adam Safiuddin, in 1030 AH/1621 AD, a small faction of Alavi Bohra in Ahmedabad recognized his grandson Ali bin Ibrahim (1046 AH/ 1637 AD) who was Mazoon, Mansoos and treasurer of Kutub e Da'wat, as his successor and got separated in 1030 AH from the majority Dawoodi Bohra who believed in Abduttayyeb Zakiuddin I, and Alavi Bohras followed a separate line of Du'aat residing mainly in Vadodara (Gujarat, India) where they have their own locality. Ali was supported by his uncle and secured very few followers. Ali never carried his protest to the court of Mughal Emperor Jahangir to declare him as a legitimate Da'i. Unverified accounts of this episode could be found in many publications.  But Ali ordered his associate Hasan Badruddin in 1031 AH/1622 AD to go to the Mughal court in Lahore to meet Jahangir to complain on his behalf about the atrocities meted upon Alavis in Ahmedabad by their opponents. The help came and the lives of Alavis became better than before. This relief was short-lived and again the harassment sprung up more fiercely. Hasan Badruddin went again to Lahore for the same reason and then traveled to Kashmir to meet Emperor Shah Jahan in 1046 AH/1637 AD, the year of Ali's death. Hasan Badruddin was not present at the time of the burial of Ali.

Ali, the 29th Alavi Da'i was born in the walled city of Vadodara in Fakhri Mohalla, when 27th Da'i Dawoodji bin Saiyedi Qutubshah was alive in Ahmedabad. His father Ibrahim died during his childhood. He was Hafiz ul-Qur'an in a tender age and when his grandfather 28th Da'i Sheikh Adam Safiuddin brought him to Ahmedabad for further studies in Uloom-e-Da'wat in the Majlis of 27th Da'i, by seeing face of Ali, 27th Da'i gave glad-tidings بشارۃ to 28th Da'i that, "This son will become the Light of your Eyes, so educate him as he is going to become the man of great acclaim"

Holding that the era of Muhammad had come to an end, a group of Alavi Bohras seceded in 1178 AH/1764 AD during the da'iship of 36th Da'i  Shamsuddin Hameeduddin in Vadodara. Because of their abstention from eating meat they were called Nagoshias (non meat eaters). They followed their separate line of leaders for the next 100 years.  In 1310 AH/1892 AD, 41st Alavi Da'i Jivabhai Fakhruddin summoned their elders and after explaining them the realities of Shari'at he respectfully accepted them and took them into the fold of Alavi Bohras.

Meaning and origin of Bohras
In India, during the time of the 18th Fatimid Imam, Al-Mustansir Billah around 486 AH/1093 AD, the designated learned people (wulaat - ولاۃ) who were sent from Yemen by the celebrated missionaries (du'aat ul-balaagh – دعاۃ البلاغ) under the guidance of the manifest Imam (as opposed to the imam of the time of seclusion) established the foundation of Isma'ili-Tayyibi Da'wat in the region of Gujarat (Cambay or Khambhat). It was the result of their perseverance and efforts that people started believing and accepting the Isma'ili-Tayyibi principles and gradually the mission of Yemen gave birth to a new community in India – The Bohras.  The succession of those designated learned people who worked as deputies of the missionaries of Yemen came to be known as Wulaat ul-Hind in India. They were all in close contact with the spiritual authority of Yemen i.e. the Da'i al-Mutlaq after the seclusion of the 21st Imam, At-Tayyib Abu'l-Qasim from Egypt.

In Ahmedabad between 825 and 1050 AH/1422-1640 AD the mainstream Bohra community got divided into 3 major groups. Among them, Alavi Bohras, who are mainly traders and merchants, are patriotic, peace-loving and harmonious people. The word ‘Bohra-بھرۃ or Vohra or Vohorwu or Vyavahar' itself indicates maintaining healthy relations and is derived from the Gujarati word ‘vohorvu’ or ‘vyavahar’, which means "to trade". Secondly its name reflects the characteristic of "al-Jamaa'at ul-Baaherah – الجماعۃ الباھرۃ" meaning the extraordinary brilliant community with full of life and love. Their cultural and social upbringing is such that the values of peace and prosperity are in their blood and they do not believe in social discord or religious conflicts. Some of the groups or clans of Sunnis in Gujarat who also are traders and do not belong to the mainstream Bohras have adopted the name of Vohra or Vora, owing to the fame and respect of the "Bohra" name. But they do not follow the basic doctrines and customs of the Isma'ili-Tayyibi Bohras. The early Indian converts of the 11th century AD during the reign of 18th Fatimid Imam Al-Mustansir Billah consisted of a single group of Isma'ili Bohras owing allegiance to the missionaries (du'aat ul-balaagh) who conveyed spiritual orders of manifest Imam (imaam-e-zaahir) to common believers in Yemen and India.

Present day
Abu Sa'eed il-Khayr Haatim Zakiyuddin is the 45th Da'i al-Mutlaq in the Line of Succession of Du'aat e Mutlaqeen الدعاۃ المطلقین.  He was born on 8th Rabi' ul-Awwal 1379 AH/10-9-1959 AD, Thursday in Vadodara. He ascended on the holy Throne of ad-Da'wat ul-Haadiyah عرش الدعوۃ الھادیۃ on 20th Sha'baan 1436 AH/7-6-2015 AD, Sunday in the presence of the whole community and took their oath of allegiance میثاق or بیعت امام الزمان علیہ السلام in the name of the 21st Imam and his progeny.  On 4th Rabi' ul-Aakhar 1442 AH/19-11-2020 AD, Thursday in Vadodara, he did Nass-e-jali on his eldest son and appointed him as his successor. 
 Ranks below Da'i al-Mulaq governing subjects of ad-Da'wat ul-Haadiyah: 
 Sa'eed ul-Khayr Bhaisaheb 'Imaaduddin is on the status of mazoon - مآذون who sits on the right side of Da'i al-Mulaq  
Mohammad Bhaisaheb Nuruddin is on the status of mukaasir – مکاسر who is next to mazoon and sits on the left side of Da'i al-Mulaq
Zulqarnain Bhaisaheb Hakeemuddin is on the status of Ra's ul Hudood. - رإس الحدود who governs different ranks below him and executes orders from his higher Spiritual status.  After this hierarchy comes the status of 24 hudood.
 Vadodara City (Gujarat, India) is the headquarters of Alavi Bohras where Zakiyuddin stays along with the family members at Devdi Mubaarak.  It is the place where 13 Alavi missionaries-du'aat, right from 32nd Da'i (1110 AH/1698 AD) stayed and imparted knowledge to their subjects in their respective periods. It has now become the hub of Isma'ili-Tayyibi branch of Learning. As it houses the Islamic Personal Library of Rare Books and the Unique Personal Collection of MSS pertaining to Isma'ili Tayyibi Literature. Under strict supervision and permission Saiyedna saheb himself manages the Library affairs.

Pledge 
These words of honour and the articles of oath-بیعۃ are the excerpts from the numerous lectures-بیان of the da'i, delivered during the month of fasting, Ramadan, and the month of mourning, Muharram. Apart from these two months there are several socio-religious occasions in which these articles of pledge is voiced among the believers and they are regularly guided to follows it.  The prime concern is the youth of the community who are educated, sensitized and encouraged about these minute things that will in turn leave great impact on the social harmony and mutual progress. 

Haatim Zakiyuddin says that, "O my Spiritual Children! Every one of you should adhere to the oath given to his Lord.  I am here as a witness-شاھد to it.  This pledge, I am repeating all the time so that it remains afresh in your minds.  As the head could not alone survive without the body, so I am your head and you all form the community as its body.  This pledge is the command and communication from the head to its body.  To remain alive and attached to its head, the body has to follow its commands.  What you are is based on the way you take the pledge."

The Spiritual head (da'i) is esoterically considered as the right hand of Imam.  The way kissing of Black Stone of Ka'bah is considered graceful, giving pledge to the da'i of Imam is similarly graceful.  While kissing the Black Stone, a pilgrim prays "O God! I have duly returned to you the trust entrusted to me, and the covenant I has made to you has been fulfilled, so that this act of mine may bear testimony to its fulfillment."  This is only after giving pledge to da'i.

 I will praise my Creator and Sustainer, Allah, for all the hidden or evident bounties that He has bestowed upon me.
 I will remain obedient throughout my life to my spiritual master-da’i and act according to his teachings and orders.
 I will respect my traditional attire and will make it the part of my identity, whenever or wherever I might be.
 I will marry an honest and noble lady of my community to keep shamelessness away, will do jihaad to protect myself from devilish acts and will perform pilgrimage to keep poverty away.
 I will respect others, all of them, irrespective of their beliefs, creed or culture.  I will speak softly, truly and reverently and will never betray them.
 I will love my family, relatives, community and the nation.  Being from society I will serve my society.
 I will abide by the lessons of my elders and well-wishers as they are ones who point to my mistakes and try to make me a better individual.
 I will acquire knowledge till my last breath from the people of wisdom and will make my living meaningful and peaceful
 I will persistently make efforts to educate my children and look after my family.  I will fulfill their needs and help them cultivate good habits.
 I will earn money through lawful and just ways.  I will never break trust of my employer or my employees and will assist them in the best possible ways.
 I will engage myself more in the religious obligations as it encompasses the worldly affairs.  I will always try to make my permanent abode beautiful after my death.
 I will pray to keep pride away, will visit tombs of my spiritual masters to keep wickedness away and will fast to keep unwanted desires away.
 I will mourn on the martyrdom of Imam Husain and remember the calamities inflicted on his household and will prepare myself that my shortcomings are nothing as compared to the sufferings to my Imam.
 I will clean my teeth and hands after every meal to keep illness away, will take bath regularly to keep forgetfulness away and will maintain good friendship to keep fear away.

Community Anthem (النشيد العلوي) 
The Community Anthem, like other symbols of Alavi Bohras, represents the heritage, tradition, history, sacrifices, struggles and beliefs of its people. Hence, it helps evoke feelings of loyalty, cooperation and unity among its people and reminds them of its glory, beauty, and rich culture.  It is a strong medium of social connection, cultural reminiscent and interaction.  This sociolinguistic composition is a mean to construct, affirm and transform the community. It occurs more frequently in ritual situations during religious ceremonials and community festivals of birth, maturation, marriage, inauguration, death and the like. It gives symbolic identity, social recognition and legitimacy to be a part of community having cultural uniqueness.

On 1st Rajab 1444 AH/22nd Jan 2023 AD, 45th Da'i e Mutlaq Saiyedna Haatim Zakiyuddin saheb declared "Parcham Hamaaro Aa'laa, Pooru Jahaan Hamaaru, Har Simt Nazar aawe, Alavi Nishaan Hamaaru." as a Community Anthem of Alavi Bohras.  It is composed by Mukaasir e Mutlaq Saiyedi Mohammad Nuruddin saheb in LDA - Lisaan ud Da'wat il 'Alaviyah on 25th Jumaadi ul Ukhraa 1444 AH/17th Jan 2023 AH at the Office of ad-Da'wat ul-Haadiyah.  It was immediately send to Saiyedna saheb for correction and then approval.  Such soul-stiring poetic composition was awaited for long and Saiyedna saheb expressed his wish at many occasions for the same.

Rajab ul Murajjab, the seventh month of Hijri year, is marked by two important historic events related to the very community name of Alavi Bohras.  First is, the vicegerent of Mohammad ul Mustafaa PBUH, Maulaana Ali Ameer ul Mumineen was born in Ka'batullaah in Makkah on 13th of this month.  Second is, the 29th Da'i e Mutlaq Saiyedna Ali saheb, the great martyr of India, ascended on the throne of Da'wat e Shareefah after the demise of his grandfather Saiyedna Shaikh Aadam Safiyuddin saheb, the 28th Da'i e Mutlaq.  The Community Anthem is related to these two significant personalities.

Mukaasir e Mutlaq Saiyedi saheb himself first recorded this composition at Daar us Salaam on 26th Jumaadi ul Ukhraa 1444 AH/18th Jan 2023 AH and in the evening was released in various community groups.  It was first recited in the presence of Saiyedna saheb in the assembly of Nikaah on the same day.  Mukaasir e Mutlaq Saiyedi saheb himself recited it during the Namaaz of the 1st night of Rajab in Musanji Shaheed Masjid.

On the occasion of the Flag hoisting ceremony, 26th January 2023, the 74th Republic day of India, it was recited by Mumbai Jamaa'at in the premises of Badri Masjid, Worli.  On the same day it was recorded in chorus by the students of Madrasah Taiyebiyah at Ajwa road, Vadodara. Along with this it was recited during the Friday prayer at various mosques.

Certain Isma'ili Tayyibi terminology

Spiritual mission 
 دعوۃ – Da’wat is a call, mission, invitation or summons related to divinity or spirituality towards the unity and oneness of Allah. The mission is of Truth and the truth could never be separated from the Almighty (al-Qur'an ch.13 v.14).  It existed before this material world and will be there after its annihilation.  It is the Mission of Truth, the Bridge towards Salvation, an Arc of Guidance, the Light showing the Point of Return, the Way to Heavens, the Proof of Imamat-امامۃ and an institution to attain ranks as per the deeds.  It also refers to the hierarchy of ranks (hudood-حدود) within the rightly guided religious organization called ad-Da’wat ul-Haadiyah-الدعوۃ الھادیۃ. The one who calls is called Da’i-داعي or Haadi-ھادي (missionary or guide) who is divinely appointed by his predecessor. Everyone who heads Da’wat right from the first prophet Adam until Muhammad, his progeny and their deputies are called Da’i with the same aim, guidance and directives.  Da’wat is for Unity and Peace.  Outwardly it is in the form of Islam and inwardly it is Imaan-ایمان (faith).  Today, 45th Da’i al-Mutlaq Saiyedna saheb is the deputy of the Da’wat of Imaam uz Zamaan-امام الزمان, the hidden imaam from the lineage of 21st Imam Abul Qasim At-Tayyib.
The Da'wat is organized hierarchically, in line with the particular importance accorded to hierarchism and step by step designation in Fatimid Isma'ili thought carried forward in its Tayyibi branch in Yemen and India called as Tayyibi Isma'ilism, continuing down to the present time.  Indeed, there is a close analogy between the terrestrial hierarchy of the Fatimid Da'wat organization with its highest ranks of Naatiq (Nabi, prophet), Asaas (Wasi, vicegerent) and Imam, and the celestial or cosmological hierarchy developed during the period of the Fatimid Caliphate and strictly followed by the missionaries in India today.

Designating a person on a spiritual rank 
 نص – Nass: It is an explicit, clear and specific declaration and designation through Divine Indication and Spiritual Intervention-تأئید إلھي for the appointment of a successor-منصوص, be it an Imam or his deputy-داعي during Imam's concealment by his predecessor-ناص amongst his subjects, publicly-نص جلي or privately نص خفي and at times supported by written documentary orders-سجل شریف.  This tradition and practice-سنۃ اللہ is related to the Isma’ili Taiyebi succession to the seat of Imaamat, whereby each Imam under hidden heavenly commands designates his successor, when he witnesses the Light of Imaamat-نور الإمامۃ has got transferred to one of his sons whom he selects for Nass.  During the seclusion of Imam, his deputy-Da’i performs this act of succession whom he finds eligible for the status of Da’i.  He might not be from his sons, unlike the succession of Imam where an Imam always appoints his successor from one of his sons.  The succession of Imaamat has begun from the  Adam Safiyullaah-آدم صفي اللہ and will continue till the last day when Qaa’im ul Qeyaamah-قائم القیامۃ will act as the final authority on the Day of Judgement.

Da'i al-Mutlaq 

 الداعي المطلق، داعي المطلق – ad-Da'i ul-Mutlaq or Da'i al-Mutlaq: It is the spiritual rank in Isma'ili Tayyibi Da'wah which became more explicit and operational after the seclusion of 21st Fatimid Imam of Cairo, At-Tayyib Abu'l-Qasim in 528 AH/1134 AD. After Muhammad this rank is on the 6th position and after this comes Mazoon-مأذون and Mukaasir-مکاسر.  Before the seclusion, the Da’i or a missionary used to work under the direct orders of an Imam and his trusted associates in all the 12 islands-جزائر where faithful were present and living either openly propounding their faith or secretly due to the fear of their lives. In Yemen, after the seclusion of an Imam, Da’i was given Itlaaq-إطلاق or a free conduct and absolute religious and social authority but under the governing principles of Isma'ili Tayyibi Faith.  His command is now regarded as a final decree guided by the divine support-الهام of Imam and this is the reason he is called Da'i al-Mutlaq.  After the death of 20th Fatimid Imam Al-Amir bi-Ahkam Allah (d. 526 AH/1132 AD), his hujjat in Yemen al-Hurrah al-Malekah (d. 532 AH/1138 AD) appointed the first Da'i al-Mutlaq Zo'eb bin Moosa al-Waade’i.  From this time onwards 532 AH/1138 AD the headquarters of Tayyibi Isma'ilism was established in Yemen where the development of Tayyibi Da'wah came under the powerful leadership of Da'i al-Mutlaq.  The Musta'lavi Tayyibi Da'is of Yemen and their aides were accredited and responsible for maintaining the high standards of the Fatimid literary tradition.  Da'i is considered "like infallible"-كالمعصوم as he is not self-proclaimed head of the community but he is only acting as a legatee to Imam.  He is not an Imam but enjoying all powers that an Imam holds under the capacity of Imamat.
Unlike the case of Imam, where he appoints his successor only from his sons through divinely guided practice called Nass-نص, the Da’i can appoint anyone in his place who is most trusted, pious and capable of carrying responsibility of Da’wah affairs with wisdom and proficiency.  Once a Da'i propagates Nass to a person or appoints his successor it could not be reverted.  Haatim Zakiyuddin is the 45th Da’i al-Mutlaq of Alavi Bohras in the line of succession of these Da’is in which 24 are in Yemen, 7 are in Ahmedabad, 1 is in Surat and 12 are in Vadodara.  Followers call him with honorific title of "Saiyedna saheb", "Aqaa Maulaa" or "Bawa saheb".

Mazoon al-Mutlaq 
 المأذون المطلق – al-Mazoon al-Mutlaq, Mazoon e Mutlaq: The Licentiate, Authoritative Rank, the most trusted associate in Da’wah ranks who takes Bay’at -Pledge of Loyalty from his subjects by the orders of Da’i al-Mutlaq.  He is on a Spiritual Rank in the Isma’ili Tayyibi Da’wah hierarchy immediately below the authority of Da’i who sits in his right side and who carries out the religious activities as per the regulations of Da’wah organization. At any cost he always assists and obeys his superior and his Master, the Da’i al-Mutlaq. His prime responsibility is to conduct teaching sessions and make them understand the basic things of Isma’ili Tayyibi faith. In the absence of Da’i he acts as his legatee. Da’i may appoint his Mazoon as his successor. And if not Da’i can appoint someone more learned and efficient for the post of Da’i after him and can never disqualifies Mazoon from his post. As the respectable post of Mazoon is necessary for the completeness of Spiritual Hierarchy.  As far as Alavi Da'wah is concerned, from the time of 28th Da'i in Ahmedabad till 45th Da'i in Vadodara, every Mazoon has become Mansoos (successor) of a former Da'i. There exist not a single instance where Mazoon and Mansoos are separate entities. Da'i after examining minutely appoints his Mazoon only when he finds him eligible to be his successor. On the death of Mazoon, Da'i immediately appoints another trusted person on this rank.

Mukaasir al-Mutlaq 
 المکاسر المطلق – al-Mukaasir al-Mutlaq, Mukaasir e Mutlaq – The Eight and the last rank in the Spiritual Hierarchy of the Isma’ili Tayyibism. He sits left to the Da’i al-Mutlaq during the religious gathering-Majlis. He is lower to the rank of Mazoon. He is well versed and well informed about the baseless beliefs of other sects for which he thinks as a threat to the faith of believers. His responsibility is to train the beginner – مستجیب مؤمن and win over the neophyte who is little aware of the overall understanding of Islamic Faith and by proper grooming he enters him into the fold of Isma’ilism by taking Oath of Fealty in the name of the present Da’i al-Mutlaq. He is quite expert in putting Rational and Logical arguments with necessary ideological and doctrinal proofs and healthy debates. On the death of Mukaasir, Da'i entrusts this rank to one of his close associates. In some cases, on the death of Mazoon, Da'i elevates Mukaasir to the rank of Mazoon.

A Beginner in Isma'ili Tayyibi Faith 
 مؤمن مستجیب – Mu'min Mustajeeb – A Believer or a Beginner in Isma'ili Tayyibi Faith who pure-heartedly, respectfully, devotionally and uncondionally accepts the guidance from Mukaasir e Mutlaq and gives Oath of Obedience to all the Eight Spiritual Ranks viz. from Mukaasir to Nabi (prophet). After giving oath he initiates his long journey of learning, piety and salvation. With every passing day he only learns and acquires the articles of faith which his Superiors think beneficial for him. As he is a beginner, as per Isma'ili Faith, he cannot doubt or question a little bit on any command of his Masters (صاحب مقام).

Salaam and Qadam-bosi 

 سلام – Salaam – Salutation, Safety, Greeting, Peace or Respect of a person with Spiritual status or a general believer of Da'wat ul-Haqq (mission of truth).  It is one of the beautiful attributes of Allah the Almighty.  This term is used 19 times in the Qur'an and it is equal to the letters if "Bismillaah ir Rahman ir Raheem", the beginning of the Qur'an and the most recited verse in the Islamic World.  The completion of any supplication (du'aa-دعاء) is endorsed with the Salaam (salawaat-صلوات) on the Prophets and their households.  It also refers to the prescribed Islamic voluntary or compulsory monetary payments done by a believer throughout the year to the Da'i (missionary).  It is the basic element of Islamic etiquette and ethics.  It is regarded as good practice to start any talk with "as-salaamo 'alaykum"-السلام علیکم (peace be upon you).  The greeting of the people of Paradise-اھل الجنۃ is Salaam.  The faith of Islam is nothing but Salaam.  The core of  Islam is to remain in Peace and to make others feel Peace. A believer must do salaam & qadam-bosi-قدم بوسي (to kiss right knee of an Imam) after every prayer (namaaz).  Salaam is that a believer bows down in front of an Imam then holds his right hand while keeping his right eye first then left eye then forehead and at the end kisses his hand.  This he does 2 times.  Then at the end kisses his right knee and does request for Du'aa and blessings.  This refers to the Prophetic tradition that, "Paradise is underneath the Feet of Mothers," Mothers here means the Imam or his representative (da'i) from the progeny of Muhammad.The Heart of the Qur'an is its Chapter Yaa Seen (36).  The heart of this chapter is its verse "Peace is the word from a Merciful Lord" (58).  The heart of this verse is Salaam.  So truly speaking the essence of Qur'an is Peace.  The first sign of hypocrisy and enmity is to stop offering Salaam. Prophetic Traditions:This book "Light in the Heavens" has been edited and translated by Tahera Qutbuddin 1. Offering the peace-greeting and speaking with kindness will assuredly win God's mercy.  2. Call out the peace greeting and you will know peace. 3. Show concern for your relatives, even with a greeting. 4. The greeting of our people is "Peace", our subject's security. 5. Greet before conversing. 41st Indian missionary Saiyedna Jivabhai Fakhruddin (d. 1347 AH/1929 AD) says in his poetic verses, "Khuda ne kaha jinko har dam Salaam, Kalaam unka hai goya Haqq ka Kalaam", God has offered Salaam to the ones whose dialogue and words are the words of Truth (God).

Shajarah 
 شجرۃ - Shajarah - Tree.  Tree means the spiritual hierarchy within the Tayyibi Da'wat.  It starts from the first prophet of Islam Maulaana Adam who conveyed the core message of the oneness of Allah till the Last prophet of Islam Muhammad al-Mustafa who is the Seal of Prophethood.  After him his progeny became the guardian of Islam and this will continue till the Last day of Judgement.  This holy tree will never die and it will provide the cool shadow of peace and progress to the travellers in this world in the form Du'aat-missionaries. 
In Qur'anic verses the Holy Tree-شجرۃ طیبۃ is referred to the Light of Allah which means keeping faith in Aal e Muhammad and their Da'i and this faith gives Noor to the heart of the faithful (ch. 24 v.  35). This Holy Tree is also related to the Good Utterance-کلمۃ طیبۃ i.e. the Imam from the Pure Progeny-ذریۃ طیبۃ of prophet Muhammad who will remain all the time for the guidance of humanity.  The roots of this holy tree is very strong and spread across the land and its branches have gone high in the heavens (ch. 14 v. 24). Muhammad says in one of his Hadees: "I am in this world like a traveler who takes a nap in the shade of a tree on a hot day, then continues on his way." Here, the shade of tree is Nubuwat (prophethood) and the hot day is the world of ignorance.  After getting divine attachment one can proceed in his travel and hope for the better Hereafter-آخرۃSaiyedna Hasan bin Nooh Bharuchi in one of his works brings vivid description of this Holy Tree: "Muhammad al-Mustafa is the base (root), 'Ali Ameer ul-Mumineen is its trunk, Faatimah az-Zahraa is its branches, Imam Hasan and Imam Husain are its fruits and flowers and Shi'a is its leaves.  It has been grown in the Paradise, the like of which one can never find on this earth."

List of missionaries

Yemen - يمن 
During the time of 18th Fatimid Imam Al-Mustansir Billah and his son, 19th Fatimid Imam Al-Musta'li, four important personalities strengthened the foundation of Fatimid Da’wat in Yemen. They were Saiyedna ‘Ali bin Muhammad as-Sulayhi, Saiyedna Ahmad al-Mukarram, Saiyedatona Hurrat ul-Malekah Arwaa binte Ahmad and Saiyedna Lamak bin Maalik. They injected new life in the Walaayat of Imaam uz-Zamaan and guided the faithful to the Path of Truth and Justice. Faithfuls were in peace and harmony under their leadership.

After the demise of Maulaana Imam Musta'li, his son, 20th Fatimid Imam Al-Amir bi-Ahkam Allah, ascended to the throne of Imamat on 17th Safar 495 AH/1101 AD. His period of Imamat is 31 yrs. He was martyred by his enemies in Cairo on the night of 4th Zul Qa’dah 526 AH/1132 AD and died on the same night. Maulaatona Hurrat ul-Malekah, who was in Yemen during all these hard times, was preparing to establish firmly the institution of Fatimid Tayyibi Da'wat in Yemen in the name of the 21st Fatimid Imam At-Tayyib Abu'l-Qasim who was born to 20th Imam Aamir on 4 Rabi' al-Aakhar 524 AH/1130 AD in Cairo. She acted as Hujjat-proof of Imam during this period.  She came to know the fate of Fatimid Caliphate through the signs sent to her by 20th Imaam.  Saiyedna Lamak bin Maalik and Saiyedna Yahya bin Lamak learned the knowledge of Da’wat from Maulaatona Hurrat ul-Malekah that helped her by all means in the administration of Da’wat. This was a crucial time when there was an imminent fall of Caliphate in Cairo and simultaneous reinforcement and establishment of Fatimid Da’wat in Yemen.

There were numerous Hudood who were seeking the knowledge of Da’wat by the permission of Maulaatona Hurrat ul-Malekah from Saiyedna Lamak bin Maalik and Saiyedna Yahya bin Lamak. Out of all Hudood, Saiyedna Zo’eb bin Moosa and Saiyedna as-Sultan al-Khattaab were outstanding in grasping the teachings and intricacies of the Fatimid Da’wat. They both clearly stood out of the group in their smartness and intelligence. With the permission of Maulaatona Hurrat ul-Malekah, they were ascended to the higher ranks of the Hudood and were given privilege to acquire the complete knowledge of Da’wat. These two personalities, in future, were to become pivotal forces in the beginning of the succession of Du’aat ul-Akrameen-missionaries in Yemen. Maulaatona Hurrat ul-Malekah now had two more loyal Hudood to support her. No one knew, but this was Hikmat (wisdom) of Allah that within a span of 10 years Saiyedna Lamak bin Maalik and Saiyedna Yahya bin Lamak died in Yemen,  In their absence, Saiyedna Zo’eb bin Moosa and Saiyedna as-Sultaan al-Khattaab served Da’wat with full devotion in such a way that Maulaatona Hurrat ul-Malekah never felt void of anyone.

Before her death on 22nd Sha'baan 532 AH/1138 AD, she appointed Saiyedna Zo'eb as the First Da'i al-Mutlaq داعي المطلق of three 3 jazaa'ir Hind, Sindh and Yemen.  Thus one after the another this succession of Du'aat al-Mutlaqeen دعاۃ المطلقین continued in Yemen till the death of 24th Da'i Saiyedna Yusuf Najmuddin I on 16th Zul Hijjah 974 AH/1567 AD.

Ahmedabad - احمدآباد 

During the 11th century AD, when 18th Fatimid Imam Al-Mustansir Billah was in power in Cairo, the region of Khambhat, Patan and Siddhpur saw extensive activities of Isma’ili Da’wat and then after the concealment of the 21st Fatimid Imam At-Tayyib Abu'l-Qasim in 532 AH/1138 AD, the holy preachers and propagandists worked under the absolute guidance of their religious chief-da’i al-mutlaq who were serving as a representatives of their concealed Imam.  These preachers served as the head of the Da'wat in Indian subcontinent, locally known as the wali or maulaai, were regularly selected by the da'i al-mutlaq residing in Yemen.  It was during the da’iship of 17th Da’i Hasan Badruddin (809–821 AH/ 1406–1418 AD), the city of Ahmedabad was founded and Ahmad Shah I invited Adam Shujaa’uddin bin Sulaiman, Shaikha Mujaal and Khwaja Kalaan to convince the Bohra traders and rich merchants to start their trade from Ahmedabad and make it their home-town. Till the time of 19th Da'i Idris Imaduddin (832-872 AH/1428-1468 AD), due to the efforts of  Adam Shujaa’uddin sizable Bohras migrated from Patan to Ahmedabad.

So this was the period of the first Bohra settlement in Ahmedabad as it proved to be a safe haven for the peace-loving community scattered in the other towns surrounding Ahmedabad.  At that time sizable Bohra population could be found at Patan, Khambhat, Siddhpur, Nadiad, Kapadvanj, Bharuch, Vadodara, Umreth, Mehsana, Dholka etc.  Bohras prospered in Ahmedabad but it was overshadowed with some brutal and gruesome attacks now and then by the Muslim Sultanate.  The Bohras of Gujarat and their da'is were not persecuted by the local Hindu rulers, who did not feel endangered by their activities.  The community thus developed without any hindrance until the Muslim conquest of Gujarat in 697 AH/1298 AD, when the Da'wat's activities came under the scrutiny of the region's Muslim governors, who recognized the suzerainty of the Sultans of Delhi, who belonged to the Khalji and Tughluqid dynasties.  It was chiefly because of Ja’far Patani Naherwali and his people who left Isma’ili-Tayyibi faith and accepted Sunnism and they constantly instigated local Muslim rulers against the Bohras.  During the time between 850 and 950 AH/1447-1544 AD many preachers-Maulaai were martyred or jailed.  Ahmedabad became called "Nani Karbala" (small karbala) because of the large number of martyrs buried there and also "Baagh-e-Aal-e-Mohammad" (paradise of Ahl e Bayt). 28th da'i al-mutlaq Sheikh Adam Safiuddin (d. 1030 AH/1621 AD) held the key leadership and played pivotal role in managing the internal community matters and external political affairs in Ahmedabad during the time of various da'is, he studied with 24th da'i in Yemen and was authorized to propagate the mission-da'wat in the Deccan.

During the rule of Mughal Emperor Akbar & Jahangir, Bohra community witnessed 2 major splits in Ahmedabad.  The Bohras got divided into three major groups viz. Alavis, Dawoodis and Sulaymanis in the span of nearly 40 years- 997–1030 AH/1589-1621 AD.  This way Ahmedabad today enjoys the only converging place of all the three Bohra groups after the splits as their du’aat-missionaries are buried in the same graveyard located at Saraspur (Bibipur). Due to the constant persecution by the Muslim rulers, Bohras left Ahmedabad permanently and shifted their seat of Da’wat.  Alavi Bohras migrated to Vadodara in 1110 AH/1699 AD during the da'iship of 32nd da'i acting on the will of his predecessor and they were the last among Bohras to leave Ahmedabad.  Dawoodi Bohras migrated to Jamnagar in 1065 AH/1657 AD and Sulaimani Bohras had their centre in Yemen after the split.  Among Bohras in Ahmedabad, today Alavi Bohras remain as a minority with small number of families stay there.

Vadodara - ودودرة 

The city of Vadodara deserves a special attention along with the Tayyibi missionary activities in Ahmedabad as many devoted personalities worked hard to retain the community faith when the turmoil of dissidents created by Ja’far Naherwali was at its peak.  During the time of 21st Da’i al-Mutlaq Saiyedna saheb (tus) Hasan Badruddin bin Idris (d.  933 AH/1537 AD) when Mahmood Shah II was the sultan of Gujarat, Mulla Isma’il of Vadodara migrated to Ahmedabad and he was martyred along with his accomplices on the banks of Sabarmati River.

Vadodara is the birthplace of 28th, 29th and 30th Alavi Da'is who migrated and did Da’wat in Ahmedabad from 1021 to 1047 AH/1612-1638 AD.  It was the place called Fakhri Mohalla near Gendi gate in the Walled city area where all 3 of them lived.  Till date this mohalla is populated by Alavi Bohras.  During the time of 26th Da'i al-Mutlaq Saiyedna Dawoodji Burhanuddin bin ‘Ajabshah (d. 997 AH/1589 AD) when Muzaffar Shah III ruled Gujarat, Saiyedi Musanji bin Taaj saheb (d. 986 AH/1578 AD) of Vadodara was martyred in the Mandvi gate when he invited Saiyedna saheb to inaugurate the mosque which he had built after returning from Hajj, avoiding Salaahuddin the then governor of Muzaffar Shah III.  The mosque named Fakhri masjid is the oldest Bohra mosque in Vadodara where Alavi Bohras today offer daily prayers.

After unbearable oppression meted upon Alavi Bohras during the time of 31st Da’i al-Mutlaq Saiyedna Hasan Badruddin bin Wali in Ahmedabad, he ordered 32nd Da’i al-Mutlaq Saiyedna Jivabhai Ziyauddin bin Noohji to migrate along with the community to Vadodara.  He spearheaded the cause of migration and in 1110 AH/1699 AD he established a new locality for the community where he built Ziyaai Masjid and Badri Mohalla.  Badri Mohalla proved a cradle of progress and prosperity for the entire community.  An Alavi Bohra who resides anywhere in the world and he visits Vadodara has to come to Badri Mohalla as the residence of Saiyedna saheb is located right in the middle of it.

Since 328 years (1110–1438 AD/1699-2017 AD), Vadodara has remained the centre and the seat of modern Alavi Bohras (ad-Da’wat ul-Haadiyat ul-‘Alaviyah) where 12 of its missionaries (du’aat) are buried here with a short interlude when 35th Da'i did Da’wat in Surat for 19 years between 1158 and 1178 AH/1745-1764 AD.  Except 35th Da'i, all of them are from the progeny of Noohji bin Mohammadji, the father of 32nd Da'i.  The present 45th Da'i Saiyedna Haatim Zakiyuddin saheb is the descendant from the same Aal-e-Noohji.  Badri Mohalla, Fakhri Mohalla, Ajwa Road, Taiwada, Fatehgunj, Mughalwada, Pratapnagar, Panigate are the main areas of Vadodara where Alavi Bohras stay.  They have 4 mosques and 3 community halls in Vadodara.

During the time of 41st Da'i al-Mutlaq Saiyedna Jivabhai Fakhruddin (d. 1347 AH/1929 AD),  Gaekwadi ruler Maharaja Sayajirao III (d. 1358 AH/1939 AD) ruled Vadodara and he single-handedly spearheaded its progress and prosperity.  Saiyedna maintained cordial and healthy relationship with the ruler as during the festivals Saiyedna often sent delegation in the Gaekwadi royal court to represent Alavi Bohras.  This was because most of the shops of Alavi Bohras were located in the narrow streets surrounding the Mandvi area involved in the business of turban making.  At that time Alavi Bohras had a monopoly of making red turban laced with golden string and Gaekwadi courtiers used to frequent these shops.   Today, many Alavi Bohras are having their shops in this area inherited from their forefathers is the testimony of the social relations with Gaekwads.

Surat - سورة 

When Saiyedna Jivabhai Ziyauddin saheb, the 32nd Da'i al-Mutlaq migrated from Ahmedabad to Vadodara in 1110 AH/1699 AD, Saiyedi Shaikhali from Surat along with his son Noorbhai visited Saiyedna saheb when he was busy constructing the mosque at the corner of Badri Mohalla named Masjid-e-Ziyaai.  During that time Noorbhai was very young and with pure intellect he witnessed the spiritual supremacy of Saiyedna saheb.  Saiyedna saheb ordered Saiyedi Shaikhali to leave Noorbhai in Vadodara for religious education and training and granted him all the permissions to carry out community responsibilities of Surat.   Saiyedi Shaikhali was a successful merchant but at the same time an ardent follower of Saiyedna saheb.  Along with many Alavi Bohra families, he stayed in Noorpura Mohalla near Jhapa bazaar. In the same area there was a mosque, graveyard and musaafir-khaana that were managed by Saiyedi Shaikhali.  After his death, Alavi Bohras of Surat relied upon Noorbhai for all Da’wat affairs as he was among the most trusted Hudood  of Saiyedna saheb, the 33rd Da'i Hebatullaah Mo'ayyaduddin.

Saiyedna Hebatullaah Mo'ayyaduddin, conferred him the status of Mukaasir by bestowing him the epithet of "Nuruddin-نورالدین (the light of religion)".  He often visited Vadodara along with the people of Surat and used to give oath of loyalty to Saiyedna saheb.  Surat city became the centre of Alavi Bohras, though for a short period of time i.e. 19 years was only because of the pure heartedness and trustworthiness of Noorbhai Nuruddin, the 35th Da'i of Alavi Bohras.  This was the time when Surat witnessed the transition period from Mughal rule to British dominion and the place where Saiyedna Noorbhai Nuruddin lived in the railway station area near Tapti River is considered the oldest area of the city and it is from here that the development of the city started in the early 20th century AD. After his death in 1178 AH/1764 AD, his son Shaikh Adam stayed in Surat and looked after the community like his father and grandfather.  During this time there were around 50 Alavi Bohra families staying in Surat.  The centre again got transferred to Vadodara and majority of Alavi Bohras migrated there along with their identity and surname as “Surtis”. Today the tomb of Saiyedna Noorbhai Nuruddin is the most revered place where mosque, community hall and musaafir-khaana are situated.  For divine blessings every Alavi Bohra visit this place once in a year.  Every year on the occasion of ‘Urs Mubaarak (death anniversary) of Saiyedna Noorbhai Nuruddin in Moharram a grand function is held in Surat where Alavi Bohras participate with great fervor and faith.

Reasoning and Religiosity of Esotericism 
Knowledge (‘ilm-علم) and wisdom (hikmah-حكمۃ) are, according to Isma’ili belief, eternal gifts from God, revealed to humanity through His prophets. God has successively dispatched six prophets bearing a law (shari’ah): Adam, Noah, Abraham, Moses, Jesus Christ and Muhammad. These prophets are ‘speakers’ (naatiq-ناطق), because they talk to men, proclaiming to them a shari’ah, an exoteric (zaahir-ظاهر) law with its commandments and prohibitions, its ritual obligation and legal definitions. By the side of each prophet-speaker stands an authorized representative (wasi or asaas-وصي، اساس) who knows and teaches eternally immutable ‘esoteric meaning’ (baatin-باطن) of all these prescriptions and regulations-though only to a small number of the elect.

Thus, Adam and his son Seth at his side, Noah and his son Shem, Abraham's wasi  was his son Ishmeal, Moses's wasi was his brother Aron, and Jesus Christ's was Simon Peter. The speaker-prophet  of our era is Muhammad. His wasi or asaas is his cousin and son in law ‘Ali ibn Abi Taalib. The latter's descendants are the true imams of Islamic community (ummah); they alone know and transmit the ‘esoteric meaning’ of the divine revelation proclaimed by Muhammad. The imams, whose succession continued with the Fatimid caliphs in Cairo till the 21st imam Abul Qaasim at-Taiyeb and their succession is in its place till date though in seclusion, are thus the repositories of the divine message; they are the upholders of ‘Knowledge’ and ‘Wisdom’, which they transmit to their followers, they are the ‘friends of God’ (awliya Allah-أولیاء الله).

The imams spread ‘Knowledge’ and ‘Wisdom’ based on exoteric and esoteric interpretation of divine law through ‘Summoners’, da’is, these are propagators or missionaries who summon people to follow the true imam and instruct the individual who ‘responds to the summons’, al-mustajib or the initiate, through wise sayings and necessary knowledge. The missionary or Da'i as a teacher is the most characteristic figure of the Isma’ili movement. From the very beginning, the Da'i's travelled far and wide to spread the good tidings.

Tanzeel-تنزیل or Tafsir-تفسیر (outer meaning or commentary on the Qur'an) is completely based on Ta’weel-تأویل (inner meaning) without which Tanzeel becomes void and meaningless.  The everlasting beautiful outward appearance is from inside and that which could not be seen and could not be understood by everyone.   The belief that each and every Qur'anic verse has both outer and inner meaning as the same is the case with the sayings of Mohammad which are applicable and acceptable in all times till the last Day of Doom.

As distinct from the zaahir (evident meaning) of the literal wordings of sacred texts and religious prescriptions, notably the Qur'an and the Shari’ah, the baatin is the inward, hidden or esoteric meaning having deep and stronger impact on the deeds and thoughts of the believers.  In the Isma’ili-Taiyebi gnosis the word baatin goes hand in hand with ta’weel and it exclusively denotes the method of inducing the baatin for the allegorical, symbolic and esoteric interpretation or spiritual-hermeneutic exegesis of historic events and the world of nature as described by the sacred Islamic texts. Ta’weel became the hallmark of Isma’ili thought and literature.  It is to manifest the hidden so as to unveil the true spiritual reality only to those who are properly initiated into the community and who have acknowledged the spiritual guidance of the rightful imam of his era or his representatives who possess the rightful authority to interpret Islam in all its dimensions.  Qur'anic verses throws light on this subject in the following way:
 And bestowed His favours, external and esoteric, in abundance on you? And yet there are men who contend about God without any knowledge or guidance or the Book enlightening.  (al-Qur'an 31–20)
 He is the first and He the last, the transcendent and the immanent; and He has knowledge of everything.  (al-Qur'an 57–3)
 But those who are twisted of mind look for verses metaphorical, seeking deviation and giving to them interpretations of their own; but none knows their meaning except God; and those who are steeped in knowledge affirm: "We believe in them as all of them are from the Lord." But only those who have wisdom understand.  (al-Qur'an 3–7)
This type of allegorical interpretation is applied on the Hadith of Mohammad:
 Unity is mercy, dissent punishment.
 The Qur'an is the real cure.
 The mosque is where the pious live.
 The pinnacle of wisdom is fear of God.
 Paradise lies beneath your mother's feet.
Numerous books are dedicated to this topic and it has been written throughout the Islamic era and the same is carried out today too by the missionaries. The distinction between the zaahir and baatin was an integral part of the religious system of thought elaborated by the Isma’ili missionaries of different periods and this particular process continued with the Taiyebis in Yemen.  Below is a small example of esoteric text taken from Kitaab al-Kashf by Ja’far b. Mansur al-Yemen in the mid 4th century AH/10th century AD.

"The Qur’an begins with bismillaah al-rahmaan al-raheem (بسم الله الرحمن الرحیم); bismillaah is composed of seven letters.  twelve letters emerges from this and that are al-rahmaan al-raheem.  This verse is the beginning of the first chapter of Qur’an surat ul-hamd which has total seven verses.  The seven letters, which are the bismillaah, signify the seven naatiq. The twelve letters that arise from these signify that for each naatiq there are twelve naqeebs or hujjats.  Thus the twelve letters, which are al-rahmaan al-raheem, that arise from the seven lettered bismillaah, together become nineteen letters.  This signifies that from the naatiqs – after each naatiq – seven imaams and twelve hujjats arise, which makes nineteen.  The same is the case with pillars of Islam, in which there are seven pillars each having twelve traditions."

Library 
The Personal Alavi Library, housed in the Residence of Saiyedna saheb is the centre of Isma'ili Studies with special reference to the Taiyebi Branch of Literature.  There are various Academic and Research Institutions which carry out studies on Isma'ili Taiyebi Literature basically starting from 225 AH (c. 840 AD) until the present based on Ahaadees, Akaaleem, Riwaayaat and historic events with the assistance of renowned and experienced scholars in their respective fields.  Specifically the study of Isma'ili Literature is part and parcel of the studies of Near-Eastern Languages and Culture. Generally every University that carries out these studies also includes the study of Arabic Language which is fostered by Isma'ili scholars.  These specific, selective, and special studies are centered in a very few Institutions which house Isma'ili Taiyebi Manuscripts (MSS) found in Arabic.

During the second half of the 20th century AD and in recent years scholarly, critical, and significant research work is being carried out in European, American, and Middle-Eastern Universities.  But it always requires second thought and important inputs based on Isma’ili dogmas from the authoritative seat of Da’wat.  Scholars who are not at all in the system of Isma’ili Faith lack that special touch while dealing or summarizing or translating texts of Core Beliefs.  It is because these Isma’ili literary gems had been written by Du’aat in the presence of an Imam or by his commands.  It contains an Oath for the Imam on which its reader must follow and without which one is not supposed to even open a book.

As these books which were guarded in the private possessions made their way to Scholars and Researchers, the central point of the Oath was mindlessly neglected and anyone who had an access to these books started their work.  No doubt great efforts and hard work have been carried out by the researchers but still there remains always a dot of doubt.  The Institutions which possess rich and periodically diversified Isma’ili manuscripts have now become epicenter of scholarly activities and academic journalism.  The centre of ad-Da’wat ul-Haadiyat ul-‘Alaviyah houses several hundred manuscripts which is managed, preserved, conserved, and enriched by the 45th Da’i al-Mutlaq Saiyedna saheb.  This personal library contains some of the rare Islamic and Isma’ili titles and with every passing day newer titles are added.

This collection is under the direct access, supervision, and control of the Da’i al-Mutlaq and therefore the nature and process of addition to the collection is also noteworthy and the fact is that the Da’i being the sole authority of Isma’ili-Taiyebi learning is cognizant of the contents of each and every manuscript, old as well as recent ones.  It has been observed that due to the maintenance of secrecy of Isma’ili Literature, the private family collections in Yemen, Sindh, and Hind are never in direct access to the public domain nor are the manuscripts lent or shared to any aspirant of the study. But, regarding the ad-Da’wat ul-Haadiyat ul-‘Alaviyah collection, despite its original and unique source, the Da’i is lenient in sharing the manuscripts after thoroughly assessing the just and critical way of translating, editing and publishing.  Though the centre of ‘Alavi Da’wat does not directly invite scholars or researchers from foreign universities, time and again many interested foreign scholars have come straightforwardly and studied Isma’ili titles with the Da’i himself from Iran, the United Kingdom, the United States, and Europe.

At times, when the scholars who worked for the critical study and edition of any Isma’ili title might be having only two to three manuscripts from different origins, i.e. where the writer, place and period differ, there arose the demand for the consultation of more manuscripts. For this purpose, the manuscripts of the ‘Alavi Da’wat collection, because of its Indian origin, proved more fruitful for better text reading and editing.  The other salient feature of the ‘Alavi Library is that it is housed at the Da’i's residence and most of the manuscripts are copied by the Du’aat from those which were brought to Vadodara when the Da’wat headquarters were shifted from Ahmedabad.

It has been well-preserved and well-maintained by the Da’i's great efforts. Like many other places where such manuscripts were bundled for centuries and remained under lock-and-key and were never referred to or studied, the case is entirely different here. At the ‘Alavi Library, the Da’i consults and refers to these manuscripts and accordingly copies its texts in individual papers for lecturing purposes and hands over certain old manuscripts to his close aides to make a fresh copy by penning the entire text.  With age-old methods the preservation of the manuscripts is carried out. As the Da’i personally handles all library affairs, the question of precaution, curing, or fumigation never arises.  But the Du’aat felt it compulsory to make a copy of every manuscript as there was a constant fear of a single copy being damaged by any unexpected accident or worm attack.  Every year more and more manuscripts are added to the collection and also they are copied as and when required.

The manuscripts copied by the 45th Da'i al-Mutlaq Saiyedna Haatim Zakiyuddin saheb since 1405 AH/1985 AD:

Islamic calendar: occasions and commemoration as per the calculation of Fatimid imams

Society 
Allah created humans as a final and complete being which is the sign of His Supreme Authority. The position of humans is above all His creations.  Unlike others he needs society, education and work to survive.  He, the Exalted made manifest from the hidden knowledge and the stored judgement in Adam and Eve (آدم ۔ حواء), the two parents, a male and a female, as a cause for the creation of mankind and society to reveal His mighty power.  He paired them and they procreated, and the children and the number increased.  They were transferred through the chaste loins and pure approved wombs.  Alavi Society is based on 6 steps like everything which has 6 dimensions.  These 6 steps is further rooted in 6 distinguished things created by Allah for His divine mission-دعوۃ.  It is 1. Qur’an (القرآن) – the divine book, 2. Nabi-نبي (warner) – prophet, 3. ‘Aalim-عالم (learned) – the vicegerent of the prophet, 4. Shaahid-شاهد (witness) – the imam of the descendants of prophet, 5. ‘Aabid-عابد (pious man) – missionary in the place of imam, and 6. Khalq-خلق (universe) – things into existence.

It is relayed by the eminent 15th century Sunni Egyptian author al-Maqrizi, Fatimid Caliph Imam al-Mo'iz wished to impart the principles of compassionate society and governance to the leaders of the Kutama tribe and to deter them from an opulent lifestyle.  He says, "I summoned you in my chamber so that you could see what I do when I am away from you and far from your eyes.  My status exceeds yours only because I have responsibility over your affairs on earth and because Allah has singled me out as your Imam.  I busy myself with letters that come to me from the east and west, to which I respond in my own hand."  This is how Imam responded to each and every society members.  The six dimensions or "M-م" of the Alavi Society in place of above mentioned things are:

1.     Madrasah (مدرسۃ) – religious seminary: It stands for the teaching of the holy Book where children learn the basics of their community.  It is the beginning of their involvement in the social development and relations.  The first heavenly order that the Muhammad received at Mount Noor under the Hira cave was "to read".  So it became necessary for every believer to acquire knowledge throughout his lifetime from the designated person and the representative of Muhammad from his progeny.  So, Madrasah is not only meant for children but it is the learning hub for those who are keen in knowing the realities of creation.  Prophetic traditions says, "Seditions appear and crush believers-your only salvation is your learning." Social health based on the overall knowledge is served by this "M" of Madrasah.  The importance of reading which is the stepping stone of any learning institution could be well found in the foremost Qur’anic verses, "READ in the name of your Lord who created.  Created man from an embryo. Read, for your Lord is most beneficent.  Who taught by the pen.  Taught man what he did not know."(al-Quran 96–1)

2.   Misaaq (میثاق) – covenant: After completing basic religious and social learning, a learner or an ordinary Alavi initiate steps into puberty and towards intellectual advancement.  Now in order to become a member of a community and begin his spiritual journey with an Imam, he has to give unconditional and lifetime oath of fealty or the promise for loyalty to the Imam's representative i.e. Da'i al-Mutlaq. This divine tradition and sublime submission was initiated from heavens and will be continued till the last day of this creation.  The prophets took this oath from their respective people of their time and they commanded their missionaries to do so in order to protect their faith.  The initiate is also bound by this oath to keep secret the esoteric knowledge imparted to him by a hierarchy of teachers authorized by the Isma'ili Imam.  He has to renew this oath to Imam every year on 18th Zul Hijjah known as Eid e Ghadeer e Khumm-عید غدیر خم.  

Once the believer had solemnly bound himself through the oath, he could undergo a step-by-step introduction into 'wisdom'-not all at once, for that would exceed his mental capacity.  'You are being put to a test,' the Da'i would say to his disciples, 'For you are beginners, and a beginner is like an infant: you should start first with milk and only later nourish yourselves with food.'  This "M" of Misaaq induces religious responsibility into faithful's life and it helps to bring maturity for social well-being. For this Qur’an says that, "When We made the covenant with the Prophets, and with you (O Mohammad), as with Noah and Abraham, Moses and Jesus son of Mary, a binding covenant,  (It was) so that Allah may ask the truthful of their sincerity. As for the infidels, He has prepared a painful punishment for them."(al-Quran 33–7)

3.   Masjid (مسجد) – mosque:  After offering covenant to Da’i, the head of the community, An Alavi tries his level best to fulfill all its obligations and this begins at the very doorstep of a mosque. The centrality of the mosque is inevitable for a believer.  Each and every socio-religious activity revolves around it.  Prophetic traditions says, "The mosque is where the pious live." A believer goes three times daily to offer prayers. There he is educated and informed about different social programs and being a part of a community how he should serve his fellow members and actively participate in the social and welfare activities.  This "M-م" of Masjid-Mosque proves to be a perfect training centre for creating responsibility, positivity, respect and thoughtfulness among people.  Being a learned and authoritative person, a Da'i in his capacity trains his followers in maintaining social etiquettes and ethos by imparting necessary knowledge in his sermons.  Da'i is the soul of the mosque and with his prostration, people in the mosque prostrates in front of Allah.  The Qur’an says about a mosque which is the best place for worship, that "O sons of Adam, attire yourselves at every time of worship; eat and drink, but do not be wasteful, for Allah does not like the prodigals."(al-Quran 7–31)

4.   Mazaar (مزار) – mausoleum:  It is an important place for a believer that is filled with spirituality and devotion. A holy person having special designation conferred by an Imam in the spiritual hierarchy is buried here. After offering prayers in a mosque people come to pay respect to the mausoleum and take waseelah-intercession while doing supplication to fulfill their wishes in front of Allah.  Usually mausoleum or tomb of a Da'i or a religious authority is situated besides the mosque.  It plays a key role in social bonding as each and every community member visit it daily or weekly or when he wishes.  If anyone visits a Rawzah-mausoleum of a particular Da'i then it is said that, he took blessings of all those people who were in the covenant of that Da'i. Mazaar of a Da'i is also called "Rawzah" as it is like a paradise and one can feel its fervor and freshness by spiritually attaching himself to Da'i.  Every believer is a martyr-Shahid and the mausoleum of a Da'i is the master of all martyrs who were from his believers.  Visiting mausoleum is like going to the entrance and gate of paradise. If one has learned Qur’anic recitation in Madrasah, gave Misaaq to his Da'i and has an habit of coming to a mosque for prayers, then surely he will visit Mazaar.

In this account, Imam Ja'far as-Saadiq addresses Kufan people and encourages them to visit the tomb of al-Husayn b. 'Ali: 'If one of you performs the hajj in the course of your lifetime and does not visit the grave of al-Husayn, then you have departed from one of the duties and rights of Allah and His messenger.  It is the duty ordained upon every believer.'  Qur’an reiterates that same thing that, "The greediness of plenitude keeps you occupied, till you reach the grave.  But you will come to know soon; indeed you will come to know soon."(al-Quran 102–1)

5.    Majlis (مجلس) – religious gathering:  an assembly or a special private audience accompanied with prayer where a discourse of a Da'i is held is generally termed as majlis.  It begins with the praise and elegy relating to the household of Muhammad or a religious dignitary associated with them. Prophetic traditions says, "The most commodious assembly is best."  The main majlis is held during the first 10 days of Moharram in the commemoration of the martyrdom of the grandson of  Muhammad, Imam Husain.  Throughout the year different types of majlis are held during the inauguration of any place, oath of fealty, marriage, birthday, sehra, ziyaarat, weekly lectures, madrasah or mausoleum.  As per the occasion and time, every member of the community more or less participates in these majlis.  It accounts to be a crucial cord of social harmony and awakening as one who attends it comes to know his roots, history, tenets, good-evil aspects of life, relations with others and social customs.  

Under the Fatimids, these type of private lectures or teaching sessions were organized for different categories of participants in Cairo, including the initiates, courtiers, high officials, women and royal women. During the reign of Fatimid Caliph Imam al-Mustansir Billah, his Da'i al-Mu'ayyad leaves nothing to be desired in the field of knowledge and rhetorical skill through conducting various majlis.  He continued to be honoured as the connecting link and catalyst of an unbroken religious and social tradition extending from Fatimid Egypt to Tayyibi Yemen and India.  Right up until today, after more than a thousand years of history, the entire Tayyibi community still regards him as their spiritual ancestor and social torch-bearer.  The holy book Qur’an says this point in a very beautiful way, "O you who believe, when you are told to make room in the assemblies, then make room; Allah will give you more room to spread. When you are told to rise, then rise; Allah will raise those of you who believe, and those who have knowledge, in position. Allah is aware of what you do."(al-Quran 58–11)

6.   Maa’edah (مائدۃ) – meals taken together by family or community members in a single big plate: This big dining plate is also called "thaal"  in which special Bohra dishes is served collectively and all those sitting around it on the floor takes their meals together.  Maa’edah is kept on a little elevated tool called "taraqqi". There is a custom of arranging a big thaal decorated with all types of dishes on the first night of a new year in which the entire family sit and eat and pray for the prosperous year.  There are strict rules governing the etiquettes of eating or sitting in a "thaal".  7 people used to sit in it and they all begin by taking a pinch of salt and reciting "bismillaah".  Washing hands before and after sitting on the thaal is compulsory.  One should lick his fingers after finishing his meal and he should never leave a bit of food in the "thaal".  People sit in Maa’edah in Jamaa’at-khaana and take lunch or dinner on various social or religious occasions.  Sociability increases among community members as they often sit together and discusses current affairs of their interest in a "thaal". Muhammad and his household taught the tradition of Maa’edah.  It has become an inseparable part of Alavi Bohras’ social life.  One can find this in this Qur’anic verse, Said Jesus, son of Mary, "O Allah, our Lord, send down a table well laid out with food from the skies so that this day may be a day of feast for the earlier among us and the later, and a divine sign from You. Give us our (daily) bread, for You are the best of all givers of food."(al-Quran 5–114)

Naming of Child (تسمية) 
A child is named on the 7th day of his/her birth.  Due to some reason if parents skip this day then they are free to name their child on any suitable day they wish.  In recent years the custom of naming a child is clubbed with Aqeeqah-عقيقة that could be performed on 7th or 14th or 21st day of his/her birth.  If this is not done on time then that person could do his Aqeeqah himself during his lifetime. Aqeeqah means the shaving of child’s head is accompanied by the Zabihat-ذبيحة (ritual sacrifice) of a she-goat.  On this occasion a child is brought from his mother’s house and in the presence of his father and family members, his paternal aunt (father/grandfather’s eldest sister) takes him into her lap facing Qiblah and the shaving of the head is done. With Qur’anic recitation, “Kaaf-ك” is written near his right ear and “Noon-ن” on his left ear.  Blessed Black Thread of Ka’bah-Karbalaa-Najaf in small pieces are tied on both hands and legs for good omen.  He is made to wear White Malmal Jhabhla-ململ جھبھلو given by Da’i along with Name.  As Da'i is the representative of Imam and Imam will call his believer by this given Name on the Day of Judgement-يوم القيامة.   Name is written in Arabic with the use of Saffron on the front side of Jhabhla.  Names are often preferred and selected from the names proposed by Da’I or Marhoomeen-مرحومين of the family.  Aunt recites Azaan in the right ear and Iqaamat in the left by loudly pronouncing the chosen name.  Equivalent to the weight of child’s hair Sadaqah (cash or silver) is given, sweets and Zabihat gosht  is distributed among relatives.  Child’s mother is not permitted to eat Zabihat gosht as he is breast-fed.  Child’s father gives precious gift to his sister for this memorable event.

Salient features

The City of Vadodara
The Peaceful City of Vadodara (Gujarat, India) is the Centre of Da'wah Haadiyah 'Alaviyah الدعوۃ الھادیۃ العلویۃ (Alavi Bohras, Alavi Da'wat) since 1110 AH/1698 AD when 32nd Da'i e Mutlaq الداعي المطلق Saiyedna Jivabhai Ziyauddin migrated along with community members to Vadodara due to persecution and tyranny of other Muslim and Bohra communities.  Saiyedna helped each and every Alavi Bohra migrant to get settled in Wadi area gifted by the Shi'a benevolent person Miya Mahmood.  He constructed a Mosque, named Ziyaai Masjid at the entrance of the Mohalla (locality) called Badri Mohalla.

Du'aat (missionaries) after migration
Alavi Bohras have all the Du'aat دعاۃ from 32nd till the 44th Da'i e Mutlaq Saiyedna Taiyeb Ziyauddin buried in Vadodara except 35th Da'i whose grave is in Surat.  So during these 3 centuries 12 Du'aat have their mausoleum at a single place i.e. Vadodara.

Da'i knows everyone
8000 believers of Well-Knit, Educated and Organized Alavi Bohra Worldwide Community has a distinction that their Saiyedna saheb known popularly as Aqaa Maulaa knows each and every of the community by his Name, Family, Social Status, Education and Occupation.  He directly meets everyone and resolves issues with his own capacity be it Spiritual, Social, Financial, Marital or Personal.  He is surrounded by his Ashaab اصحاب or believers wherever he goes and doesn't need any security.

Asbaaq

Asbaaq of Faith: Since years together, Da'i, Mazoon, Mukaasir and Ra's ul-Hudood impart Religious Knowledge centred on Isma'ili Taiyebi Literature, dealing with Aqaa'id-عقائد (dogmas, beliefs), Sunan-سنن (traditions), Rusoomaat-رسومات (customs), Aa'maal-اعمال (deeds), Zamaan-e-Haal-زمانۂ حال (current affairs) by conducting Special as well as General Daras-درس (learning classes) weekly.  Alaviyeen-علویین i.e. Believers from all walks of life come to acquire knowledge directly from Da'wah Central Authority to enhance their Intelligence and Wisdom.

‘Urs Mubaarak

‘Urs Mubaarak-عرس مبارک is the auspicious and historic day commemorating the Death Anniversary of the holy personalities of Ahl ul-Bayt, Missionaries (Du’aat-دعاۃ) or the Deputies (Walis) of the missionaries in India during the period of Da’wat when it was in either Misr or Yemen. After the prayer of sunset (maghrib-مغرب) people gather in a mosque or in a mausoleum in the presence of Da’i al-Mutlaq to pay respect in the form of sweets, chaadar (flowery sheet), ghilaaf (decorative drape).  It is a unique socio-religious festival in which Da’i al-Mutlaq (Saiyedna saheb) addresses people and makes them aware about the simple and pious life of Du’aat-دعاۃ, their works and sacrifices, their prayers and admonitions.  Tenets of Isma’ili-Taiyebi faith are dealt with in detail in such gatherings such as salvation, life after this world, accounts and answers to be given to angels, paradise and hell, good and bad deeds and its reward or punishment, the day of qeyaamah (یوم القیامۃ), the proceedings of the deceased in his grave, supplication and prayer for the pardon of evil actions etc.  In the gathering eulogy of the deceased holy personality (Da’i) is recited by the Zaakireen.  A feast is arranged for all of them present in the majlis and Supplication of Purity (Faatihah-فاتحۃ) is recited before taking the food.  In the morning, the next day after offering prayer of dawn (fajr-فجر) the same type of majlis is held but a special supplication called “Sadaqallaah-صدق اللہ”  is recited for the deceased and then after paying respects a special dish called Malida is arranged for all the participants.  This is the unique way to offer tribute to the deceased who had laid their lives for the Truth and Justice and to commemorate their true stories of piety and strive to get the best in the Hereafter.

Ten days of Moharram 

Moharram ul-Haraam-محرم الحرام is the first month of Islamic Lunar Year and its first ten days have a great significance in Shi’i world.  When New Year is celebrated with merriment and joy, Alavi Bohras have a total different course of traditions to greet the gracefulness of the New Year. The first ten days are called ‘Asharah Mubaarakah-عشرۃ مبارکۃ as it is marked with weeping and mourning on the Martyrdom of the 2nd Imaam Abu ‘Abdillaah Husain, grandson of Muhammad in Karbalaa.  72 martyrs laid their lives for Truth against the demand of Bay’at-Oath of Allegiance by Yazeed.  Till the tenth day known as Yaum e ‘Aashuraa, Da'i al-Mutlaq recites sermons and delivers lectures everyday in the morning in Jaame’ Masjid, Vadodara.  Lectures encompass guidance and admonitions relating to all aspects of life and it is the golden opportunity for the community members to meet each other.  All these days are packed with the religious and social activities revolving around the life and sacrifices of Ahl ul Bayt.  A beautiful Sabeel-water outlet made of silver is erected every year at the entrance of Badri Mohalla conceptualized by Neknaam Shaikhali Alibhai acting on the orders od 42nd da’i Saiyedna Fidaali Badruddin in 1366 AH/1946 AD.  It was first erected publicly only for a year in Mumbai at Mohammad Ali road and then it was taken to Vadodara. Alavi Bohras cook a special sweet dish "Lachko" on the first night and first day of a New Year and it is kept in a big platter-Thaal adorned with many types of dishes and fruits.  On the tenth day of Moharram i.e. ‘Aashuraa a dish called "Khichdo" is cooked for the whole community at different places to commemorate the martyrdom of Maulaana Imaam Husain.

Community at a glance

Status

This is the Nano-Minority Community of Gujarat- In the world Muslims are in Minority.  Among Muslims Shi'a are a Minority.  Among Shi'as Isma'ilis are a minority.  Among Isma'ilis, Bohras are a minority.  Among Bohras Alavi Bohras are a minority.  Meaning Alavi Bohras are a minority (Bohras) within a minority (Isma'ilis) within a Minority (Shi'a) within a Minority (Muslims).

Language

Lisaan ud-Da'wat il-'Alaviyah (LDA) لسان الدعوۃ العلویۃ is the Unique language spoken by Worldwide Alavi Bohras.  It is basically Gujarati Language but it is embellished, supported and structured by Arabic, Persian and Urdu words, idioms, phrases, adverbs, proverbs or sometimes the whole sentence.  It is very sweetly spoken among community members in homes, daily routine and socio-religious gatherings.  Da'i al-Mutlaq is doing lot many efforts in keeping this language alive.  He prefers to speak in LDA and advocates others too to follow him.  It has been evolved since centuries in Gujarat during the time of 18th Faatemi Imaam Maulaana Mustansir billaah who sent his missionaries for the propagation of Isma'ili faith around the end of 5th century AH.

Culture
Alavi Bohras have a culture that is unique in terms of dressing style, eating habits and working for livelihood. Majority of the Alavi Bohras stay in Vadodara, Gujarat and are engaged in their own business be it their shops or factories. Learning and Education is given a lot of importance but the preference of carrying on their family business always remains on top. There is no restriction for females as far as education, job and business is concerned, as the same is not the case in other societies and cultures. Females are given the same status and freedom as the males of the communities, but the things should be done under the Islamic practices and social framework.  There are many initiatives carried out for the overall progress and development of the skills pertaining to ladies. In terms of eating habits, Alavi Bohras like each and every type of food and being a Gujarati say, "yes" to everything lawful and healthy. They are very peaceful people with no interests in behavior that is termed as unlawful in the society.  They believe in "The Love for All", gives the reward as, "The Love from All".

Website
In 1425 AH/2004 AD during the time of 44th Da'i al-Mutlaq Saiyedna Abu Haatim Taiyeb Ziyauddin saheb, the website was conceptualized and launched with the sole aim of making the community and World aware of the History, Practices, Customs, Events, News, Principles, Calendar, Literature, Prayers, Business, Family and Social life, Education, Occupation etc. of Alavi Bohras.  It has been controlled, edited and promoted by the office of Saiyedna saheb.  Hence there remains no need to confirm any information and news of the community.  It can be said that, the World gets the first-hand information directly from the Da'i himself.  Since its launch it caters to each and every aspect of the community.  If any layman who doesn't know the ABC of Alavi Bohras, then by visiting the website no question of his will remain unanswered.  Every scholar or a researcher who is doing work on Alavi Bohras will dedfinitely have to go through this community website.

Mobile app
Exclusive Mobile Application "Ahl uz Zikr" was launched in June 2016 on Android as well as on iOS platform. This application has now become  the main medium of connectivity between Da’wat e Haadiyah-Chief Religious Authority and the community members. Office of Da'i saheb is gradually updating and adding all required features for community learning and development. Ahl uz Zikr has become the prime source of all Divine Knowledge apart  from the community website. Looking at the wide acceptance of mobile phones among the youngsters, it is time to have an acceptable platform for the propagation of Right Ideas.  It includes News, Events, Farmaan, Conversation, Audio, Video, Classifieds, Calendar, Date Conversation, Namaaz Timings, History, Qiblah Direction, Supplication, Hadees, Tasbeeh counter, etc.

Bank
Alavi Bohras have a leading co-operative bank in the city of Vadodara named as 'Alavi Bohra Co-operative Bank'. It is a very popular bank among the city residents and serve as good employer for the Alavi Bohra community and its people.

History of the Imāmī-Alāvī Bohras 

{| class="navbox" style="float:center; margin: 2ex 0 0.6em 0.5em; width: 8em; line-height:111%;" 
!The schematic history of the development of the Imāmī-Mustā‘lī Alāvī Bohras from other Shī‘ah Muslim sects
|-    
|

Gallery

See also
Atba-i-Malak
Atba-e-Malak Badar
Atba-i-Malak Vakil
Dawoodi Bohra
Progressive Dawoodi Bohra
Succession to 52nd Dai al-Mutlaq
Hebtiahs Bohra
Patani Bohras
Sulaymani Bohra
Sunni Bohra

References

Further reading 
 Daftary, Farhad: Isma'ili Literature: A Bibliography of Sources and Studies. London, 2004.
 Abdul Husain, Mian Bhai Mulla: Gulzar e Daudi for The Bohras of India. Progressive Publication, Surat, 1977. p. 31, 46
 
 Poonawala, Isma'il K: Bibliography of Isma'ili Literature. Undena Publication, Malibu, California, 1977. p. 13, 369, 368
 
 Daftary Farhad: Sayyida Hurra: The Isma‘ili Sulayhid Queen of Yemen.
 SV Mir Ahmed Ali: The Holy Qur'an: Commentary of Qur'an-e-Majeed.  Peer Mahomed Ebrahim Trust, Karachi. 1976
 Daftary, Farhad: A Modern History of the Ismail. Article on "Alavi Bohras" by Tahera Qutbuddin. IIS, London, 2011. p. 355

External links
 
 Alavi Traditional Recipes
 Videos: Ritual Purity (Wuzu)
 Videos: Ritual Prayer (Namaaz)

 
Social groups of Gujarat
Muslim communities of Gujarat
Muhajir communities
Vadodara
Tayyibi Isma'ili branches